Night Island may refer to:

 Night Island (Queensland), Great Barrier Reef Marine Park west of Cape Melville, Queensland, Australia
 Night Island (Tasmania), Preservation Island Group, Tasmania, Australia